The 2012–13 Pepperdine Waves men's basketball team represented Pepperdine University during the 2012–13 NCAA Division I men's basketball season. This was head coach Marty Wilson's second full season at Pepperdine. The Waves played their home games at the Firestone Fieldhouse and were members of the West Coast Conference. They finished the season 12–18, 4–12 in WCC play to finish in a tie for seventh place. They lost in the second round of the WCC tournament to San Diego.

Before the Season

Departures

Recruits

Roster

Schedule and results
All non-conference home games, and conference home games not picked up by the WCC regional packages, are shown on TV-32 in Malibu, known as Pepperdine TV. They are also shown on pepperdinesports.com at no cost for all fans to enjoy.

|-
!colspan=9 style="background:#FF6200; color:#0021A5;"| Exhibition 

|-
!colspan=9 style="background:#0021A5; color:#FF6200;"| Non-Conference Regular Season

|-
!colspan=9 style="background:#0021A5; color:#FF6200;"| WCC Regular Season

|-
!colspan=9 style="background:#FF6200; color:#0021A5;"| 2013 West Coast Conference men's basketball tournament

References

Pepperdine Waves men's basketball seasons
Pepperdine
Pepperdine Waves Men's Basketball
Pepperdine Waves Men's Basketball